Yo pecador ("I, a sinner") is a 1959 Mexican film. It stars Sara García.

External links

References 

1959 films
Mexican biographical drama films
1950s Spanish-language films
1950s Mexican films
Mexican musical drama films